Catephia philippinensis is a species of moth of the  family Erebidae. It is found in the Philippines (Luzon).

References

Catephia
Moths described in 1929
Insects of the Philippines
Moths of Asia